Tokutarō is a masculine Japanese given name.

Possible writings
Tokutarō can be written using different combinations of kanji characters. Some examples:

The characters used for "taro" (太郎) literally means "thick (big) son" and usually used as a suffix to a masculine name, especially for the first son. The "toku" part of the name can use a variety of characters, each of which will change the meaning of the name ("徳" for benevolence, "得" for gain, "啄" and so on).

徳太郎, "benevolence, big son"
得太郎, "gain, big son"
啄太郎, "peck, big son"
篤太郎, "sincere, big son"
竺太郎, "bamboo, big son"

Other combinations...

徳太朗, "benevolence, thick, bright"
徳多朗, "benevolence, many, bright"
徳汰朗, "benevolence, excessive, bright"
得太朗, "gain, thick, bright"
得多朗, "gain, many, bright"
登久太郎, "climb up, long time, big son"

The name can also be written in hiragana とくたろう or katakana トクタロウ.

Notable people with the name
, Japanese general
, Japanese politician
, Japanese Yakuza member
, Japanese photographer
, Japanese footballer
Tokutarō Watanabe, Japanese businessman

Japanese masculine given names